Romedal is a former municipality in the old Hedmark county, Norway. The  municipality existed from 1838 until its dissolution in 1964 when it became part of Stange Municipality. The administrative centre of the municipality was the village of Romedal where Romedal Church is located. Other villages in Romedal included Ilseng and Starhellinga. The municipality centered around the agriculture and forestry industries.

History
The parish of Romedal was established as a municipality on 1 January 1838 (see formannskapsdistrikt law). During the 1960s, there were many municipal mergers across Norway due to the work of the Schei Committee. On 1 January 1964, the municipality of Romedal (population: 6,441) was merged with the neighboring municipality of Stange (population: 9,734).

Name
The municipality is named after the old Romedal farm since this is where the first Romedal Church was located.

Government

The municipal council  of Romedal was made up of representatives that were elected to four year terms.  The party breakdown of the final municipal council was as follows:

Mayors
A list of the mayors of Romedal:

1838: Nils Christoffersen Gaustad
1839-1842: H. Wegener
1843: Christen Larsen Arneberg
1843-1844: Lars Christian Sandberg
1844-1845: Anton Hansen Horne
1845-1847: V.F. Krog
1847-1849: Christen Larsen Arneberg
1851: Gulbrand Øvergaard
1854: Anton Hansen Horne
1855-1859: S.H. Ræder
1859-1860: Kjel Sande 
1861-1863: L.G. Bryhn 
1863–1867: Jens Øvergård 
1867-1871: Lars Arneberg 
1871-1873: Hans Antonsen Horne
1873-1875: N. Hals 
1875-1877: O.A. Bryhni
1877-1879: Lars Arneberg 
1879-1882: L.G. Bryhn
1882-1883: O. Pedersen
1883-1891: Johan A. Horn 
1891-1893: Lars Busvold 
1893-1897: Kr. Horn 
1897-1898: Olaf Bryhn 
1899-1916: Anton Julius Tøsti
1917-1919: L. Julseth 
1920-1922: O. J. Maagaard
1923-1928: L. Julseth 
1929-1931: Alfred Johnsen (Ap)
1932-1948: Karl Petersen (Ap) 
1941: G. O. Bahus (Ap)
1941-1944: Arne Stramrud (NS)
1944-1945: Ole J. Lie (NS)
1948-1964: Jens K. Nybruket (Ap)

See also
List of former municipalities of Norway

References

Stange
Former municipalities of Norway
1838 establishments in Norway
1964 disestablishments in Norway